Macgregoria is the scientific name of two genera of organisms and may refer to:
 Macgregoria (bird), monotypic bird genus containing MacGregor's honeyeater (M. pulchra)
 Macgregoria (plant), a genus of plants in the family Celastraceae